Megascolia is a genus of large solitary wasps from the family Scoliidae, the species classified under Megascolia include some of the world's largest wasps. They are parasitoids of large Scarabeid beetles such as the European rhinoceros beetle Oryctes nasicornis and Atlas beetle Chalcosoma atlas.

Species
The following species are classified in the genus Megascolia which is further divided into two subgenera, Megascolia and Regiscolia:

Subgenus Megascolia
Megascolia (Megascolia) procer (Illiger, 1802)
Megascolia (Megascolia) speciosa  (Smith, 1857)
Megascolia (Megascolia) velutina (Saussure, 1859)

Subgenus Regiscolia
Megascolia (Regiscolia) alecto (Smith, 1858) 
Megascolia (Regiscolia) azurea (Christ, 1791)
Megascolia (Regiscolia) bidens (Linnaeus, 1767)
Megascolia (Regiscolia) capitata (Fabricius, 1804)
Megascolia (Regiscolia) fulvifrons (Saussure, 1854) 
Megascolia (Regiscolia) maculata (Drury, 1773)
Megascolia (Regiscolia) philippinensis (Rohwer, 1921) 
Megascolia (Regiscolia) rubida (Gribodo, 1893)
Megascolia (Regiscolia) splendida (Saussure, 1858)

References

Scoliidae